Dan's Hill is a historic home located near Danville in Pittsylvania County, Virginia.  It was built in 1833, and is a -story, five bay Federal style brick dwelling.  It has a double pile, central-hall plan and a gable roof.  Also on the property are the contributing kitchen building, a dairy, a gazebo, an orangery, a privy, smokehouses, and a spinning house.

It was listed on the National Register of Historic Places in 1979.

References

External links

Dan's Hill, State Route 1011 vicinity, Danville, Danville, VA: 12 photos, 3 measured drawings, and 3 data pages at Historic American Buildings Survey

Houses on the National Register of Historic Places in Virginia
Federal architecture in Virginia
Houses completed in 1833
Houses in Pittsylvania County, Virginia
National Register of Historic Places in Pittsylvania County, Virginia
Historic American Buildings Survey in Virginia